Alagille syndrome (ALGS) is a genetic disorder that affects primarily the liver and the heart. Problems associated with the disorder generally become evident in infancy or early childhood. The disorder is inherited in an autosomal dominant pattern, and the estimated prevalence of Alagille syndrome is 1 in every 30,000 to 1 in every 40,000 live births. It is named after the French pediatrician Daniel Alagille, who first described the condition in 1969.

Signs and symptoms 
The severity of the disorder can vary within the same family, with symptoms ranging from so mild as to go unnoticed, to severe heart and/or liver disease that requires transplantation. It is uncommon, but Alagille syndrome can be a life-threatening disease with a mortality rate of 10%. The majority of deaths from ALGS are typically due to heart complications or chronic liver failure.

Liver 
Signs and symptoms arising from liver damage in Alagille syndrome may include a yellowish tinge in the skin and the whites of the eyes (jaundice), itching (pruritus), pale stools (acholia), an enlarged liver (hepatomegaly), an enlarged spleen (splenomegaly) and deposits of cholesterol in the skin (xanthomas). A liver biopsy may indicate too few bile ducts (bile duct paucity) or, in some cases, the complete absence of bile ducts (biliary atresia). Bile duct paucity results in the reduced absorption of fat and fat-soluble vitamins (A, D, E and K), which may lead to rickets or a failure to thrive. Cirrhosis and eventual liver failure is fairly common among ALGS patients, and 15% of those with severe hepatic manifestations require a liver transplant. Hepatocellular cancer has been reported in a small number of cases, but it is extremely rare.

Heart 

Common signs of Alagille syndrome include congenital heart problems varying from heart murmurs to significant structural abnormalities, such as Tetralogy of Fallot, Pulmonary Stenosis, overriding aorta, ventricular septal defect, and right ventricular hypertrophy are common amongst Alagille patients. Patients may also present with Ventricular septal defect, Atrial septal defect, Patent ductus arteriosus, and Coarctation of the aorta. The mortality rate of Tetralogy of Fallot when untreated ranges from 70% by age 10 to 95% by age 40. However, complete surgical repair can significantly improve both longevity and quality of life in patients with Alagille syndrome.

Other 
Other presentations of Alagille's syndrome include butterfly vertebrae, ophthalmology defects, and distinct facial structures. The butterfly vertebrae can be detected with an x-ray, but there typically are no symptoms from this abnormality. Other skeletal defects common in ALGS patients are spina bifida and the fusion of vertebrae. Most of the ophthalmological defects affect the anterior chamber of the eyeball, including Axenfeld's anomaly and Rieger anomaly, but retina pigment changes are also common. These anomalies can be beneficial in diagnosing Alagille syndrome. Many people with ALGS have similar facial features, including a broad, prominent forehead, deep-set eyes, and a small pointed chin. While these distinct facial features are often presented in ALGS patients, the features are presumably not due to Alagille syndrome, but they are characteristic of patients with intrahepatic cholestatic liver disease. So while these facial characteristics are extremely common in ALGS patients, it is because many patients experience extreme liver complications or liver failure, but it is not caused by the disease itself. The kidneys may also be affected because the mutations in JAG1 and NOTCH2 often lead to renal dysplasia, deformed proximal tubules, or lipidosis caused by the hindrance of lipid metabolism.

Genetics 
ALGS is caused by loss of function mutations in either JAG1 (Jagged1) or NOTCH2 (Notch homolog 2). In the majority of people with ALGS, the gene mutation occurs in the JAG1 gene. The  JAG1 mutation is either intragenic and found on chromosome 20p12, or it is a deletion of the entire JAG1 gene. Mutations in NOTCH2 are much less likely to cause Alagille syndrome, but the primary type of ALGS-causing mutation in NOTCH2 is a missense mutation. A missense mutation is a point mutation that changes one nucleotide, which results in a codon that codes for the wrong amino acid. Alagille syndrome is inherited in an autosomal dominant pattern, which means one copy of the altered gene is sufficient to cause the disorder. The "autosomal" aspect of the disease means that the gene mutation occurs in an autosome, which is one of the 44 chromosomes in the human body that is not a sex chromosome (chromosome X or Y). Although the majority of cases are due to the autosomal dominant gene, there have been reports of a rare, autosomal recessive version of the disease. In the autosomal recessive case, the ALGS patient must inherit two mutated genes: one from each parent. Although about 40% of the mutations are inherited from affected parents, most cases result from new, acquired mutations. These are caused by environmental factors that mutate one copy of the gene. Environmental factors that can result in gene mutations may include radiation such as ultraviolet rays from the sun, or chemicals such as benzene, which is found in cigarette smoke. These cases occur in people with no familial history of the disorder.

Pathophysiology 
JAG1 and NOTCH2 encode for proteins that are crucial to the notch gene–signaling cascade. Specifically, JAG1 encodes for a surface-binding ligand that regulates the notch signaling pathway. It plays a crucial role in cell signaling during embryonic development. If the pathway is disrupted due to mutations, an infant will not develop properly. Alagille syndrome causes bile duct paucity, which is characterized by narrow and malformed bile ducts. Bile duct paucity causes bile to build up in the liver, resulting in scarring of the liver which hinders the liver's normal functions, like blood filtration and drug metabolism.

The notch gene–signaling cascade is also important for cell–cell recognition, which involves gene regulation mechanisms that control multiple cell differentiation processes during embryonic and adult life, and is specially important for:
 Atrioventricular (AV) canal development
 Ventricular development
 Ventricle (heart) outflow tract development
 Angiogenesis
 Pancreatic development
 Intestinal development
 Bone development
 Respiratory system development
 Neuron cell differentiation
 Neurite development
 Gliogenesis
 Adult brain function

Diagnosis 
Alagille syndrome can be extremely difficult to diagnose. While people are born with ALGS, it is almost always diagnosed later during childhood. The diagnosis can be difficult because the severity of the disease varies widely among patients. Some common clinical tests that are run in order to diagnose the disease include vertebral x-rays, heart exams to detect any defects such as a heart murmur, and a liver biopsy to detect liver disease or any precursors. If a patient presents with multiple symptoms such as jaundice, heart murmur, and the characteristic facial features discussed above (deep set eyes, broad brow, etc.), they are likely to be diagnosed with Alagille syndrome. A more calculated and specific diagnosis can be done with genetic testing. Next-generation sequencing can be utilized to detect single nucleotide polymorphisms (SNPs) in the affected gene(s). Multiplex ligation-dependent probe amplification (MLPA) can detect large deletions and/or insertions and microarray comparative genomic hybridization is used to improve the accuracy of MLPA.

Treatment 
Early treatment is possible once the disease is diagnosed. Treatments of Alagille syndrome typically involve medications, therapies, and/or surgical procedures. All treatments aim to improve bile excretion from the liver, reduce pain caused by the disease, and help improve nutritional deficiencies. Diet can also be a crucial factor in improving quality of life when living with ALGS.

Medication 
Several medications are used to improve bile flow, including ursodiol (Actigall or Urso). These medications differ in their rates of success. Certain drugs may be used to reduce itching (pruritus), such as cholestyramine and rifampin. While these medications can reduce pruritus, the itching often is reduced when bile flow is improved via ursodiol or liver transplant.

Many patients with Alagille syndrome have nutritional and/or malabsorption issues which often hinders normal growth. Patients benefit from vitamin A, D, E, and K supplements because the reduced bile flow makes it difficult to absorb and utilize these vitamins. A high-calorie diet is very important, and often requires a gastrostomy tube to maintain the high caloric intake.

Maralixibat (Livmarli) was approved for medical use in the United States in September 2021.

Surgery 
Surgery is common in more severe cases on Alagille syndrome, especially for patients with liver disease or end-stage liver failure. Liver transplants can either be a complete liver transplant from a deceased organ donor, or a partial transplant from a living donor. Liver transplants can be difficult in ALGS patients because heart defects are common along with the liver failure, and such intense surgeries are dangerous for cardiac patients because they cannot handle the stress of surgery and general anesthesia.

Partial biliary diversion has been used to significantly reduce pruritus, jaundice, and xanthoma caused by poor bile flow in patients with bile duct paucity. A portion of the bile produced by the liver is directed through a surgically created stoma into a plastic pouch on the patient's lower right abdomen. The pouch is periodically drained as it fills with bile. Patients with biliary atresia may require a Kasai procedure to improve bile drainage; however, later liver transplantation is still often necessary.

See also 
 Progressive familial intrahepatic cholestasis

References

External links 
  GeneReviews/NCBI/UW/NIH entry on Alagille syndrome
  OMIM entries on Alagille syndrome

This article incorporates public domain text from The U.S. National Library of Medicine

Accessory digestive gland disorders
Ciliopathy
Hepatology
Rare syndromes
Syndromes affecting the hepatobiliary system
Congenital disorders of digestive system
Cardiogenetic disorders
Syndromes affecting the heart
Syndromes with tumors
Diseases named for discoverer